Unbalance+Balance is the fifteenth studio album by Japanese singer Akina Nakamori and first studio album to be released during 1990's. It was released on 22 September 1993 under the MCA Records label

The album includes the double A-side singles "Not Crazy To Me" (coupled with "Everlasting Love" and "Aibu" (couple with "Kataomoi").

In 2002 was released re-printed version of the album Unbalance+Balance+6 which includes original version of Not Crazy To Me, single Everlasting Love, Yoru no Dokoka de, and B-sides Rose Bud and Blue Lace, which was previously unreleased in the album recordings.

Background
It's Nakamori's first studio album to be released after 4 years and in new recording label.

The first production of the album started in summer 1992, after Nakamori finished filming television drama Sugao no Mama de. According to recording producer, Nakamori's distanced from her casual style and along with new music production staff aimed more into contemporary style.

Some of the past musical writers were involved with the album, including Takashi Matsumoto, Makoto Sekiguchi from C-C-B, Koji Tamaki from Anzen Chitai and Brasilian singer-songwriter Osny Melo. Among new team includes well-known names as Ryuuichi Sakamoto, Nokko from Rebecca and Tetsuya Komuro. Composer Akira Senju later become the main producer of the series of cover albums "Utahime".

By this album, Nakamori start be in the charge of the producing albums. It's her second self-produced album for the first time in 7 year.

It was Nakamori's idea to write two songs with same melody yet different lyrics: Eien no Tobira was written by Natsuno Serino and Kagerou by Nakamori herself. It's Nakamori's first original song for first time in 9 years.

Aibu was later recorded as a B-side in the cover single Kataomoi in 1994.

Promotion

Single
It consists of one previously released single.

Not Crazy To Me is B-side take from the twenty-seventh single Everlasting Love. It was written by Nokko and produced by Ryuuichi Sakamoto. It was released on 21 May 1993. It was Nakamori's the first single to be released in two years under new recording label. It includes renewed melodical arrangement, compared to the original. The original version was included re-printed version of album, Unbalance+Balance+6 and compilation albumUtahime Densetsu: 90's Best.

The single debuted at number 10 on the Oricon Single Weekly Charts.

It's Nakamori's final single to be released in compact disc format.

Stage performances
While the singles Gekka and Aibu were performed in the later live tours and music television programs, the albums tracks Kurobara was performed in one-night live Parco Threatre Live in 1994, Norma Jean in live tour Spoon in 1998,  Eien no Tobira and Hikaru no Nai Mangekyō were performed for the first time in acoustic live tour 21 Seiki he no Tabidachi. Kagerou was performed very often as well: Parco Theatre Live, True Akina Live in 1995 and acoustic live tour 21 Seiki he no Tabidachi.

Chart performance
The album reached at number 4 on the Oricon Album Weekly Chart charted for the 9 consecutive weeks with the sales of 186,600 copies. It's Akina's last studio album which sold over 100,000 copies.

Until 2002 cover album Zero Album Utahime 2, none of Nakamori albums didn't debut at Top 10 in the Oricon Album Weekly Charts.

Track listing

References

1993 albums
Japanese-language albums
Akina Nakamori albums
Albums produced by Akina Nakamori